Leonard Herman Wigraft (28 January 1897 – 16 January 1982) was an Australian rules footballer who played with Fitzroy in the Victorian Football League (VFL).

Football
Wigraft usually played as a follower and won a premiership with Fitzroy in 1922. He was also a three-time Best and Fairest winner with Fitzroy – in 1920, 1924 and 1925.

He captained Fitzroy in his last season of football in 1927 and was briefly their caretaker coach in 1934.

Len also coached Echuca in 1928 to their first premiership. He returned to Fitzroy in the 1930s and remained at Fitzroy as a delegate.

In recognition to his long service to the Fitzroy football club and his playing abilities, he was inducted to the Fitzroy Hall of Fame.

See also
 1927 Melbourne Carnival

Footnotes

External links

1897 births
1982 deaths
Australian rules footballers from Victoria (Australia)
Fitzroy Football Club players
Fitzroy Football Club Premiership players
Fitzroy Football Club coaches
Mitchell Medal winners
Preston Football Club (VFA) players
One-time VFL/AFL Premiership players